Greatest Hits Radio Liverpool & The North West is an Independent Local Radio station based in Liverpool, England, owned and operated by Bauer as part of the Greatest Hits Radio network. It broadcasts to Merseyside, North West England, Cheshire and parts of North Wales. The station forms part of Greatest Hits Radio North West.

As of September 2022, the station has a weekly audience of 182,000 listeners according to RAJAR.

Coverage 

Although intended mostly for Merseyside, like its sister station, it serves Flintshire, northern Denbighshire, Greater Wrexham and eastern Greater Conwy in Wales; northern Cheshire, some parts of Greater Manchester and south-western Lancashire in England via signal overspill. In the past, the station has been telephoned from the island of Anglesey.

History 
Originally it was known as "1548 City Talk", this service existed between 1989 and 1991 originally between 0700 and 1900 on weekdays. It was not a success, and a "Gold" format of music was introduced as the station initially became "Radio City Gold", and then "City Gold".

Radio City was purchased by EMAP in 1998, and City Gold was rebranded Magic 1548 as part of the network of Magic stations on AM. In December 2001, EMAP decided that it was more economical for the Magic network to share off-peak programmes and in line with the other Magic AM stations began networking between 10am-2pm, 7pm-10am, and then 2am-6am (because of Pete Price's phone-in, which switched stations in January 2006). This resulted in Magic 1548 having more local programming on weekdays. During these hours it was simply known as Magic, although there were local commercial breaks, and local news on the hour.

In January 2003, the station ceased networking with the London station, Magic 105.4, and a regional network was created with Piccadilly Magic 1152 in Manchester at the hub at the weekend and Magic 1152 in Newcastle during the week. During networked hours, local adverts are aired, as well as a local news summary on the hour.

From July 2006, more networking was introduced across the Northern Magic AM network which meant only 4 hours a day was to be presented from the local studios, between 06:00 and 10:00am. In April 2012 Magic 1548, inline with the majority of other Magic North stations, dropped local weekend breakfast shows.

Between March 2013 and December 2014, weekday breakfast was syndicated from Piccadilly Magic 1152 in Manchester. Local news and traffic bulletins were reintroduced in January 2015, when the station rebranded as Radio City 2, as part of the launch of the Bauer City 2 network.

In July 2015, Bauer submitted a formal request to OFCOM to swap Radio City 2's format and frequencies with that of Radio City Talk. The company proposed to reintroduce local breakfast and drive time programming to the station and an enhanced local news service, alongside programming provided by the City 2 network. The request was approved three months later and the switchover took place on Monday 7 December 2015.

On 7 January 2019, Radio City 2 rebranded as Greatest Hits Liverpool, North West & North Wales.

On 1 September 2020, the station was merged with several local radio stations to form a new regional station, Greatest Hits Radio North West, as part of an expansion of the Bauer network. Breakfast, evening and weekend afternoon shows for the network continue to air from Radio City's Liverpool studios.

After Wire FM closed down, GHR Liverpool & The North West ultimately inherited the 107.2 MHz FM frequency.

Programming 
Networked programming originates from Bauer's Manchester studios.

National programming is produced and broadcast from Bauer's Liverpool studios at the Radio City Tower weekdays 6-10am for Greatest Hits At Breakfast with Simon Ross.

News 
Bauer's Liverpool newsroom broadcasts local news bulletins hourly from 6am-7pm on weekdays, and from 7am-1pm on Saturdays and Sundays. Headlines are broadcast on the half hour during weekday breakfast and drivetime shows, alongside traffic bulletins.

National bulletins from Sky News Radio are carried overnight with bespoke networked bulletins on weekend afternoons, usually originating from Bauer's Manchester newsroom.

References

External links 
The Bromborough Transmitter Mast (1548 Khz)

Bauer Radio
Radio stations in Liverpool
Radio stations established in 1991